Fuss of the Fusses is a 1979 Soviet comedy film directed by Alla Surikova.

Plot 
The film tells about the registry office employee named Marina Petrovna. She registers happy marriages. And suddenly at work she sees her husband, who decides to leave her.

Cast 
 Galina Polskikh as Marina Petrovna
 Mher Mkrtchyan as Boris Ivanovich (as Frunze Mkrtchyan)
 Leonid Kuravlyov as Volodya
 Anna Varpakhovskaya as Liza
 Svetlana Petrosyants as Natasha
 Sergei Ivanov as Vasya
 Leonid Kharitonov as Yakov Andreyevich
 Lyudmila Ivanova as Serafina Ilinichna
 Yana Poplavskaya as Lidka
 Natalya Krachkovskaya as Varvara

References

External links 
 

1979 films
1970s Russian-language films
Soviet comedy films
1979 comedy films